Fairview is the name of some places in the U.S. state of New York:
Fairview, Dutchess County, New York
Fairview, Westchester County, New York